Mark Greville Burmester (born 24 January 1968, Durban, South Africa) is a former Zimbabwean cricketer who played in 3 Tests and 8 ODIs between 1992 and 1995. He played in Zimbabwe's inaugural Test, opening the bowling he became the first Zimbabwean to take a Test wicket. He is a past student of Eaglesvale High School.

In February 2020, he was named in Zimbabwe's squad for the Over-50s Cricket World Cup in South Africa. However, the tournament was cancelled during the third round of matches due to the coronavirus pandemic.

His son, Dean Burmester, is a professional golfer.

References

External links
 Cricinfo: a short biography

1968 births
Living people
Cricketers from Durban
Alumni of Eaglesvale High School
Zimbabwe Test cricketers
Zimbabwe One Day International cricketers
Zimbabwean cricketers
Mashonaland cricketers
Manicaland cricketers
Cricketers at the 1992 Cricket World Cup
White Zimbabwean sportspeople